Telchac Puerto is a port town in the Yucatan.  It is located about one hour north east of the city of Mérida (65 kilometers) and 30 minutes from Progreso.

Dining
A bakery and several seafood restaurants are in Telchac Puerto.  Fried fish stands, a tortilla restaurant, and restaurants serving ceviche, fried fish, shrimp cocktails, and fish fillets are also available.

Recreation
There is town plaza, a park with a children's play area and a lighthouse on the small seaside promenade. Three miles west of Telchac Puerto, inland, are the Mayan temples of Xcambo.

During July and August, a fair is in place in the main plaza with booths offering foods, knick-knacks and mechanical rides.

Patron saint
The Patron saint of Telchac is San Diego de Alcala.  Celebratory festivities are held in November.

General information
Population (in 2000): 1,594
Area code: 991
Weather: Warm and Humid. Rain in summer (June–August). Cold fronts in winter (November–January).
Very quiet fishing village with many houses for rent. Low season is January to April, mostly tourists from North America occupy villas. During summer time which is high season, tourists escape the tremendous heat in Mérida in favor of the cooler coastal breeze. Prices for villas double in the summer.  Many property opportunities. The beach which is part of the northern Yucatan peninsula faces northerly winds in the winter; as such the beachfront is mostly covered with white sand. Population is quite friendly.

A new marina/yacht club is now under construction in Telchac Puerto. The development will include a first-class marina, commercial and residential properties. Other residential developments are under construction both on the beach and within walking distance to the beach.

Climate

References

External links
Telchac Puerto on Yucatan Today
 www.telchacpuertoyucatan.com
 Vacation Rentals

Populated places in Yucatán